Henry Saunders House is a historic home located near Windsor, Isle of Wight County, Virginia. The house was built about 1796, and is a -story, three bay Georgian style frame dwelling. It has a gable roof with dormers and a one-story side wing.  Also on the property are four additional contributing buildings and one contributing structure.

It was listed on the National Register of Historic Places in 1991.

References

External links
 Captain Henry Saunders House, Virginia Room, National Museum of American History, Smithsonian Institution (moved from VA, Windsor vicinity, U.S. Route 460), Washington, District of Columbia, DC at the Historic American Buildings Survey (HABS)

Houses on the National Register of Historic Places in Virginia
Georgian architecture in Virginia
Houses completed in 1796
Houses in Isle of Wight County, Virginia
National Register of Historic Places in Isle of Wight County, Virginia
1796 establishments in Virginia